Surazomus is a genus of hubbardiid short-tailed whipscorpions, first described by Reddell & Cokendolpher in 1995.

Species 
, the World Schizomida Catalog accepts the following twenty-three species:

 Surazomus algodoal Ruiz & Valente, 2017 – Brazil
 Surazomus antonioi Armas & Víquez, 2014 – Costa Rica
 Surazomus arboreus Cokendolpher & Reddell, 2000 – Brazil
 Surazomus boliviensis Cokendolpher & Reddell, 2000 – Bolivia
 Surazomus brasiliensis (Kraus, 1967) – Brazil
 Surazomus brus Armas, Villareal & Viquez, 2010 – Costa Rica
 Surazomus chavin Pinto-da-Rocha, 1996 – Peru
 Surazomus cuenca (Rowland & Reddell, 1979) – Ecuador
 Surazomus cumbalensis (Kraus, 1957) – Colombia
 Surazomus inexpectatus Armas, Villareal & Viquez, 2010 – Costa Rica
 Surazomus macarenensis (Kraus, 1957) – Colombia
 Surazomus manaus Cokendolpher & Reddell, 2000 – Brazil
 Surazomus mirim Cokendolpher & Reddell, 2000 – Brazil
 Surazomus nara Armas & Viquez, 2011 – Costa Rica
 Surazomus paitit Bonaldo & Pinto-da-Rocha, 2007 – Brazil
 Surazomus pallipatellatus (Rowland & Reddell, 1979) – Costa Rica
 Surazomus rafaeli Salvatierra, 2018 – Brazil
 Surazomus rodriguesi Cokendolpher & Reddell, 2000 – Brazil
 Surazomus saturninoae Ruiz & Valente, 2019 – Brazil
 Surazomus selva Armas, Villareal & Viquez, 2010 – Costa Rica
 Surazomus sturmi (Kraus, 1957) – Colombia
 Surazomus uarini Santos & Pinto-da-Rocha, 2009 – Brazil
 Surazomus vaughani Armas & Viquez, 2011 – Costa Rica

References 

Schizomida genera